Rissling, Rißling is a German surname. Notable people with the surname include:

Alysia Rissling (born 1988), Canadian bobsledder
Gary Rissling (born 1956), Canadian ice hockey player
Kelly Rissling (born 1960), Canadian ice hockey player

German-language surnames